The Girl Who Came Late aka Daydream Believer is a 1991 Australian romantic comedy film starring Miranda Otto, Martin Kemp and Gia Carides; and directed by Kathy Mueller. Otto was nominated for an Australian Film Institute Award for "Best Actress in a Lead Role".

Plot
The 'Girl' of the title is Nell Tiscowitz (Otto), a struggling actress with an affinity for horses. She meets wealthy rock music promoter and stable owner Digby Olsen (Kemp). Nell's best friend and flatmate, Wendy (Carides) provides dubious love-lorn advice. After Nell uses her 'telepathy' to help Digby tame horses they eventually fall in love.

Production
The film was one of five films financed by the FFC Film Fund in 1990. Otto was cast after over 200 girls auditioned; it was only her second major role, after Emma's War. The role of Digby entailed looking at actors from London and Los Angeles; after Martin Kemp was cast, the occupation of the character was changed from theatre entrepreneur to rock promoter.

Release
Ozmovies says of the release:
The film was given a short release at four Hoyts cinemas (including Hoyts Centre) in Sydney, beginning 3rd September 1992, but other bookings were very limited... (It) had a frosty reception from newspaper reviewers at the time of its limited domestic release, which saw only Sydney papers (and the national The Australian) take a look at it.

References

External links

Daydream Believer at Ozmovies

1991 films
1990s English-language films
1991 comedy-drama films
Australian comedy-drama films
Films directed by Kathy Mueller
1990s Australian films